William Meynell may refer to:

 Alice Meynell
William Meynell (MP) for Derbyshire (UK Parliament constituency)